Gert Vanderaerden (born 23 January 1973) is a Belgian former road cyclist, who competed as a professional from 1996 to 2007. His older brother Eric was also a professional cyclist.

Major results

1995
 3rd Internationale Wielertrofee Jong Maar Moedig
 3rd Liège–Bastogne–Liège U23
 10th Nationale Sluitingprijs
1996
 1st Overall Coca-Cola Trophy
 1st Stage 2 Tour of Austria
 7th GP Rik Van Steenbergen
1997
 9th Schaal Sels
1998
 1st Omloop van de Vlaamse Scheldeboorden
 3rd Omloop van de Westhoek
 5th Nationale Sluitingprijs
 9th Kampioenschap van Vlaanderen
1999
 2nd GP Stad Zottegem
 3rd Grote Prijs Jef Scherens
 4th GP Rik Van Steenbergen
 5th Paris–Brussels
2000
 3rd Brussels–Ingooigem
 4th Schaal Sels
2001
 4th Schaal Sels
 4th Grote Prijs Jef Scherens
2002
 2nd Omloop van het Waasland
 3rd Road race, National Road Championships
 4th Vlaamse Pijl
 10th Kampioenschap van Vlaanderen
 10th GP Stad Zottegem
2003
 2nd Le Samyn
 2nd Grote 1-MeiPrijs
 6th GP de Fourmies
 10th Ronde van Midden-Zeeland
 10th Sparkassen Giro Bochum
2004
 1st Circuito de Getxo
 7th Rund um die Nürnberger Altstadt
2005
 1st Internationale Wielertrofee Jong Maar Moedig

References

External links

1973 births
Living people
Belgian male cyclists
People from Herk-de-Stad
Cyclists from Limburg (Belgium)